The Gros Ventre Formation is a geologic formation in Wyoming, USA. It preserves fossils dating back to the Cambrian period. The Gros Ventre consists of three main members; the Wolsey Shale, the Death Canyon Limestone, and the Park Shale.

See also

 List of fossiliferous stratigraphic units in Wyoming
 Paleontology in Wyoming

References

 

Cambrian geology of Wyoming
Cambrian southern paleotropical deposits